Susquehanna Trails is a census-designated place (CDP) in York County, Pennsylvania, United States. The population was 2,264 at the 2010 census.

Geography
Susquehanna Trails is located at  (39.761121, -76.372205) in Peach Bottom Township.

Demographics
At the 2000 census there were 2,134 people, 734 households, and 584 families living in the CDP. The population density was 671.3 people per square mile (259.1/km). There were 851 housing units at an average density of 267.7/sq mi (103.3/km).  The racial makeup of the CDP was 98.08% White, 0.75% African American, 0.09% Native American, 0.37% Asian, 0.09% from other races, and 0.61% from two or more races. Hispanic or Latino of any race were 0.89%.

Of the 734 households 46.3% had children under the age of 18 living with them, 68.3% were married couples living together, 5.7% had a female householder with no husband present, and 20.3% were non-families. 15.5% of households were one person and 4.9% were one person aged 65 or older. The average household size was 2.91 and the average family size was 3.24.

The age distribution was 31.2% under the age of 18, 6.0% from 18 to 24, 35.8% from 25 to 44, 19.4% from 45 to 64, and 7.6% 65 or older. The median age was 34 years. For every 100 females, there were 106.2 males. For every 100 females age 18 and over, there were 105.7 males.

The median household income was $42,000 and the median family income  was $45,672. Males had a median income of $36,806 versus $23,616 for females. The per capita income for the CDP was $16,695. About 1.4% of families and 3.4% of the population were below the poverty line, including 1.2% of those under age 18 and 5.7% of those age 65 or over.

References

Census-designated places in York County, Pennsylvania
Census-designated places in Pennsylvania